Serge Quik, known by the stage name Sederginne, is a Belgian drag performer who competed on the first season of Drag Race Holland.

Filmography

Television

Web series

References

External links
 

Living people
Belgian drag queens
Drag Race Holland contestants
People from Deurne, Belgium
Year of birth missing (living people)